Dasycnemia obliqualis is a species of snout moth in the genus Dasycnemia. It was described by George Hampson in 1897 and is known from Brazil.

References

Moths described in 1897
Chrysauginae